Love of My Life may refer to:

TV
 "Love of My Life" (That '70s Show), an episode of That '70s Show
 Love of My Life (Japanese TV series), Japanese television drama series
 Love of My Life (2013 film), Australian film
 Love of My Life (2017 film), Canadian film
 Love of My Life (Philippine TV series), Philippine television drama series

Music
 Love of My Life (album), a 2004 album by Keith Martin
 Love of My Life (The Best of Dan Hill), an album by Dan Hill

Songs
"Love of My Life", 1958 song written by Bryant and Bryant from Greatest Hits Vol. III
"Love of My Life", a song by Frank Zappa And The Mothers Of Invention on Cruising with Ruben & the Jets, 1968
 "Love of My Life" (Brian McKnight song), 2001
 "Love of My Life" (Carly Simon song), 1992
 "Love of My Life", a song by Gino Vannelli from The Gist of the Gemini, 1976
 "Love of My Life" (Queen song), 1975
 "Love of My Life" (Sammy Kershaw song), 1997
 "Love of My Life" (The Dooleys song), 1977
 "Love of My Life (An Ode to Hip-Hop)", a 2002 song by Erykah Badu and Common
 "Love of My Life", a song written by Artie Shaw and Johnny Mercer for the 1940 film Second Chorus
 "Love of My Life", a song written by Cole Porter for the 1948 film The Pirate
 "Love of My Life", a song by Harry Styles from Harry's House, 2022
 "Love of My Life", a song by Santana, featuring Dave Matthews, from Supernatural, 1999
 "Love of My Life", a song by Stephanie Mills from Born for This!, 2004

See also 
 "L'amour de ma vie" ("The Love of My Life"), a song by Sherisse Laurence, Luxembourg's entry in the Eurovision Song Contest 1986
 El Amor de Mi Vida (disambiguation) (The Love of My Life)
 "(Not) The Love of My Life", song by Yuna